The 2005 CONCACAF U-20 Qualifying Tournament was held to determine the four CONCACAF entrants into the 2005 FIFA World Youth Championship, which was hosted by the Netherlands. The tournament final was held in two groups of four with the top two from each group advancing. Group A was held in United States and Group B was held in Honduras. On January 16, 2005, the United States and Panama qualified to the U-20 World Cup. On January 30, 2005, Canada and Honduras achieved qualification.

Teams

The following teams qualified for the tournament:

Venues

Group A
United States hosted Group A. All of the matches were played at the Home Depot Center in Carson, California between January 12–16.

Group B
Honduras hosted Group B. All of the matches were played at Estadio Francisco Morazán in San Pedro Sula between January 26–30.

Goal scorers
4 goals

 Ryan Gyaki

3 goals

 José Güity
 Eddie Gaven

2 goals

 Ramón Núñez
 Alvaro Salazar
 Freddy Adu

1 goal

 Jose Luis Cordero
 Franklin Chacón
 Alonso Salazar
 Angel Nolazco
 Akeem Priestley
 O'Brian White

1 goal cont.
 Marco Parra
 Luis Omar Hernandez
 Armando Gun
 Luis Gallardo
 Kevin Crooks
 Kendall Jagdeosingh
 Marcelle Francois
 Chad Barrett
 Danny Szetela
 Jacob Peterson
 Will John

See also
 2005 CONCACAF U-20 Tournament qualifying
 CONCACAF Under-20 Championship
 2005 FIFA World Youth Championship

External links
  at CONCACAF.com
 Results by RSSSF

CONCACAF Under-20 Championship
U-20
International association football competitions hosted by Honduras
International association football competitions hosted by the United States
Concacaf U-20 Tournament
2005 in youth association football